"Power" is a song by New Zealand singer songwriter Sharon O'Neill. The song was released in July 1984. It was the final single release of O'Neill's on the CBS label. The song peaked at number 36 in Australia.

At the 1985 Australian pop music awards, "Power" won Best Female Performance in a Video.

Track listing 
7" (BA 223214) 
Side A "Power"
Side B "Young Blades"

Charts

References 

1983 songs
1984 singles
Sharon O'Neill songs
Songs written by Sharon O'Neill
CBS Records singles